Balta is a city in Podilsk Raion, Odesa Oblast in south-western Ukraine. It hosts the administration of Balta urban hromada, one of the hromadas of Ukraine. Population:  The city's population was 19,772 as of the 2001 Ukrainian Census.

History
 Balta is located near the Dniester River border with Moldova.

First mentions of Balta go all the way to 1526. Until 1792 Balta was part of the Ottoman Empire. In 1797 two nearby towns; Yuzefhrad (Юзефград, until 1793 part of Poland) and Yelensk (Еленськ), were added to the city. It is located in the historic Podolia region of Ukraine. According to the Russian census of 1897, with a population of 23,363 it was the fourth largest city of Podolia after Kamianets-Podilskyi, Uman and Vinnytsia. In 1900, the city's Jewish population numbered 13,235.

Pogroms occurred in Balta in 1882 and 1905.

From 1924–1929, the city was the capital of the Moldavian Autonomous Soviet Socialist Republic. With the annexation of Bessarabia in 1940, Balta became a part of the Odesa Oblast of the Ukrainian Soviet Socialist Republic. It was occupied by German and Romanian troops on 5 August 1941 and became part of Transnistria Governorate in Kingdom of Romania until its liberation on 29 March 1944 by Red Army.

Until 2016, Balta was part of Balta Raion. On 4 February 2016, it was designated the city of oblast significance but remained the administrative center of the raion.

Population

People from Balta
 Aryeh Altman, Israeli politician
 Yuly Aykhenvald, Ukrainian Jewish literary critic
 Zellig Harris, American linguist, mathematical syntactician, and methodologist of science
 Vsevolod Holubovych, Prime Minister of the Ukrainian People's Republic
 Grigori Panteleimonov, Russian sport shooter who competed in the 1912 Summer Olympics
Aryeh Leib Schochet, Rabbi
 Samuel (Sholem) Schwarzbard, (1886–1938), Yiddish poet, watchmaker, soldier, anarchist; grew up in Balta
 Louis E. Stern (b. 08/27/1886 d. 01/11/1962), American International Lawyer, patron and friend of Chagall, Picasso, Klee and Miro, collection left to Philadelphia Museum of Art and Brooklyn Museum

References

External links
 
 

Cities in Odesa Oblast
Bratslav Voivodeship
Baltsky Uyezd
Shtetls
Cities in Podilsk Raion
Balta Hromada